Short u may refer to:
 Short u, the traditional name of a vowel in English: see  
 Short U (Cyrillic), a letter in the Cyrillic alphabet